Glenview station is a Metra commuter rail and Amtrak intercity rail station in Glenview, Illinois, United States, north of Chicago. The station is located at 1116 Depot Street,  from Chicago Union Station, the southern terminus of the lines. The facility opened in March 1995 as a replacement for a since-demolished 1950s era station. The new station, designed by Legat Architects of Waukegan, cost approximately $3 million and was funded from a number of sources, including Metra, the Illinois Department of Transportation, Amtrak and the village of Glenview.

On Metra, the station is located on the Milwaukee District North Line that runs between Chicago Union Station and Fox Lake, Illinois. On Amtrak, the station is located on two lines, the Hiawatha Service that runs between Chicago Union Station and Milwaukee, Wisconsin and the Empire Builder that operates between Chicago, Seattle, Washington, and Portland, Oregon. It also served the short-lived Lake Country Limited which ran between Chicago and Janesville, Wisconsin between April 15, 2000, and September 23, 2001. Frequent, daily service is provided on both the Milwaukee District North Line and the Hiawatha, while the Empire Builder provides once-a-day service. Normally, passengers traveling between Glenview and Chicago or Glenview and Milwaukee are not permitted to board or disembark on the Empire Builder at Glenview, due to the availability of the more frequent Metra and Hiawatha  trains. However, for much of the spring of 2020, the Empire Builder allowed local travel between Glenview and Milwaukee when the Hiawatha was suspended due to the COVID-19 pandemic.

This move would eliminate lengthy stops which block traffic on Glenview Road. This move would involve reconstruction of the North Glenview station to handle the additional traffic, and depends on commitments from Glenview, the Illinois General Assembly and Metra.

As of 2018, Glenview is the 22nd busiest of Metra's 236 non-downtown stations, with an average of 1,462 weekday boardings.

As of December 12, 2022, all Metra trains on the Milwaukee District North Line make a scheduled stop in Glenview, with a total of 52 trains (26 in each direction) on weekdays, 20 trains (10 in each direction) on Saturdays, and 18 trains (nine in each direction) on Sundays and holidays. Amtrak service to Glenview consists of seven Hiawatha Service trains in each direction from Monday–Thursday, eight northbound and seven southbound on Fridays, six northbound and seven southbound on Saturdays, and six in each direction on Sundays, in addition to a single daily service by the Empire Builder.

Bus connections
Pace
 210 Lincoln Avenue (weekdays only) 
 422 Linden CTA/Glenview/Northbrook Court (weekdays only)
 423 Linden CTA/The Glen/Harlem CTA (weekdays only)

References

External links

Glenview Amtrak & Metra Station (USA Rail Guide -- Train Web)

Amtrak stations in Illinois
Former Chicago, Milwaukee, St. Paul and Pacific Railroad stations
Metra stations in Illinois
Railway stations in the United States opened in 1995
Glenview, Illinois
Railway stations in Cook County, Illinois